Here are lists of schools which only admit girls, or which only admit girls in certain grade levels, or which separate students by gender, in the United States

Arizona
 Girls Leadership Academy of Arizona
 Spring Ridge Academy
 Xavier College Preparatory (Phoenix)

Arkansas
 Mount St. Mary Academy (Little Rock)

California
 Los Angeles area
 Alverno High School (Sierra Madre)
 The Archer School for Girls (Los Angeles)
 Bishop Conaty-Our Lady of Loretto High School (Los Angeles)
 Cornelia Connelly High School (Anaheim)
 Flintridge Sacred Heart Academy (La Cañada Flintridge)
 Holy Family High School (Glendale)
 Immaculate Heart High School (Los Angeles)
 La Reina High School (Thousand Oaks)
 Louisville High School (Los Angeles)
 Marlborough School (Los Angeles)
 Marymount High School (Los Angeles)
 Mayfield Senior School (Pasadena)
 Notre Dame Academy (Los Angeles)
 New Village Girls Academy (Los Angeles)
 Pomona Catholic High School (Pomona)
 Ramona Convent Secondary School (Alhambra)
 Rosary High School (Fullerton)
 Sacred Heart High School (Los Angeles)
 St. Joseph High School (Lakewood)
 St. Lucy's Priory High School (Glendora)
 St. Mary's Academy (Inglewood)
 San Gabriel Mission High School (San Gabriel)
 Westridge School (Pasadena)
 YULA Girls High School (Los Angeles)
 San Francisco Bay Area
 Katherine Delmar Burke School (San Francisco)
 Carondelet High School (Concord)
 Castilleja School (Palo Alto)
 Convent of the Sacred Heart High School (San Francisco)
 The Girls' Middle School (Palo Alto) 
 The Hamlin School (San Francisco)
 Holy Names High School (Oakland)
 Immaculate Conception Academy (San Francisco)
 Mercy High School (Burlingame)
 Mercy High School (San Francisco)
 Julia Morgan School for Girls (Oakland)
 Notre Dame High School (Belmont)
 Notre Dame High School (San Jose)
 Presentation High School (San Jose)
 San Francisco Girls' School (San Francisco)
 San Diego area
 The Academy of Our Lady of Peace (San Diego)
 Torah High Schools of San Diego (San Diego)
 Sacramento area
 St. Francis High School (Sacramento)
 Monterey area
 Santa Catalina School (coed elem-mid, all girls' high)
 Notre Dame High School (Salinas)

 Former schools
 Corvallis High School
 Notre Dame High School San Francisco

Connecticut
 Academy of the Holy Family (Baltic)
 Academy of Our Lady of Mercy, Lauralton Hall (Milford)
 Convent of the Sacred Heart (Greenwich)
 Greenwich Academy
 Mercy High School (Middletown)
 Miss Porter's School (Farmington)
 Sacred Heart Academy (Hamden)
 Ethel Walker School (Simsbury)
 Westover School (Middlebury)

Merged:
 Rosemary Hall (Connecticut)

Former:
 Canterbury Female Boarding School

Delaware
 Padua Academy (Wilmington)
 Ursuline Academy (Coed elementary, girls' secondary) (Wilmington)

 Former
 Tatnall School (became coed)

District of Columbia (Washington, DC)
 Georgetown Visitation Preparatory School
 National Cathedral School

Florida
 Miami area
 Young Women's Preparatory Academy (Miami)
 Carrollton School of the Sacred Heart (Miami)
 Our Lady of Lourdes Academy (Miami-Dade County)
 Beis Chana High School for Girls
 Beth Jacob High School / Bais Yaakov School
 Sha'arei Bina Torah Academy for Girls
 Tampa/St. Petersburg
 Academy of the Holy Names (Tampa) (girls only for high school)
 Other
 Pace Center for Girls

Georgia
 Coretta Scott King Young Women's Leadership Academy (Atlanta)
 Atlanta Girls' School
 St. Vincent's Academy (Savannah)

Pinecrest Academy (Cumming) puts boys and girls in separate classes.

 Former girls' schools
Girls High School (Atlanta) (Became coeducational)
 Mount de Sales Academy (Became coeducational)

Hawaii
 La Pietra (Honolulu)
 Sacred Hearts Academy (Honolulu)
 St. Andrew's Priory School (Honolulu)
 Huakailani School for Girls (K-8) (Kaneohe CDP)

Illinois
 Chicago area
 Young Women's Leadership Charter School of Chicago
 Aqsa School (Bridgeview)
 De La Salle Institute (girls' campus) (Chicago)
 Josephinum Academy (Chicago)
 Mother McAuley Liberal Arts High School (Chicago)
 Our Lady of Tepeyac High School (Chicago)
 Regina Dominican High School (Wilmette)
 Resurrection High School (Chicago)
 Rosary High School (Aurora)
 Trinity High School (Chicago)
 The Willows Academy (Des Plaines)
 Woodlands Academy of the Sacred Heart (Lake Forest)

 Closed
 Marywood Academy/School (Skokie)
 Girton School for Girls (Winnetka)
 Mount Assisi Academy (Lemont)
 Queen of Peace High School (Burbank)

 Merged
 Academy of Notre Dame (Belleville area/Southern Illinois)
 Madonna Catholic High School (Aurora)
 Sacred Heart Academy (Lisle)
 St. Francis Academy (Joliet)
 Saint Louise de Marillac High School (Northfield) merged with Loyola Academy

 Became coeducational
 Guerin College Preparatory High School (River Grove)
 Roycemore School (Evanston)

 Closed
 Notre Dame High School for Girls (Chicago)

Iowa
 Closed
 Immaculate Conception Academy (Davenport)

Kentucky
 Louisville
 Assumption High School
 Mercy Academy 
 Presentation Academy 
 Sacred Heart Academy
 Northern Kentucky
 Notre Dame Academy (Park Hills)

 former girls' schools
 Angela Merici High School (Louisville; merged with the all-boys Bishop David High School in 1984 to create the current Holy Cross High School)
 Loretto High School (Louisville; merged into the formerly all-boys Flaget High School in 1973, which would close a year later)
 Our Lady of Providence Academy (Academy of Notre Dame de Providence), merged with the all-boys Newport Catholic High School in 1983 to create the current Newport Central Catholic High School

Louisiana
 Academy of Our Lady (Jefferson Parish)
 Academy of the Sacred Heart (Grand Coteau)
 Academy of the Sacred Heart (New Orleans)
 Archbishop Chapelle High School (Metairie)
 Cabrini High School (New Orleans)
 McGehee School (New Orleans)
 Mount Carmel Academy (New Orleans)
 St. Joseph's Academy (Baton Rouge)
 St. Mary's Academy (New Orleans)
 St. Mary's Dominican High School (New Orleans)
 St. Scholastica Academy (Covington)
 Ursuline Academy (New Orleans)
 Christian Brothers School (New Orleans) girls' middle school - The school has a PK-4 coeducational elementary school in both locations, an all girls' 5-7 middle school in the Canal Street Campus, and an all boys' 5-7 middle school in the City Park Campus.

Became coeducational:
 Eleanor McMain Secondary School (New Orleans)

Maine
 former girls' schools
 The Maine Girls' Academy
 Catherine McAuley High School

Maryland
 Baltimore area
 Baltimore Leadership School for Young Women
 Western High School (Baltimore)
 Bryn Mawr School (Baltimore)
 The Catholic High School of Baltimore
 Garrison Forest School (Owings Mills)
 Institute of Notre Dame (Baltimore)
 Maryvale Preparatory School (Lutherville)
 Mercy High School (Baltimore)
 Mount de Sales Academy (Catonsville)
 Notre Dame Preparatory School (Towson)
 Oldfields School (Glencoe)
 Roland Park Country School (Baltimore)
 St. Paul's School for Girls (Brooklandville)
 St. Timothy's School (Stevenson)
 Seton Keough High School (Baltimore)
 Western High School (Baltimore)
 Washington, DC area
 Academy of the Holy Cross
 Brookewood School (Kensington)
 Connelly School of the Holy Child (Potomac)
 Elizabeth Seton High School (Bladensburg)
 Holton-Arms School (Bethesda)
 Stone Ridge School of the Sacred Heart (Bethesda)

Former girls' schools:
 Closed
 Eastern High School (Baltimore)
 Eastern Female High School (Baltimore)
 La Reine High School (DC area)

Massachusetts
 Academy of Notre Dame (lower school co-ed, upper school all-girls) (Tyngsboro)
 Dana Hall School (Wellesley)
 Fontbonne Academy (Milton)
 Miss Hall's School (Pittsfield)
 Mount Alvernia High School (Newton)
 Nashoba Brooks School (lower school co-ed, middle school all-girls) (Concord)
 Newton Country Day School (Newton)
 Notre Dame Academy (Hingham)
 Notre Dame Academy (Worcester)
 Stoneleigh-Burnham School (Greenfield)
 Ursuline Academy (Dedham)
 Winsor School (Boston)
 Woodward School for Girls (Quincy)

Former girls' schools
 Became coeducational
 Boston Latin Academy
 Closed
 Girls' High School (later became coeducational as Roxbury High School)

Michigan
 Detroit area
 Detroit International Academy for Young Women (Detroit)
 Academy of the Sacred Heart (Bloomfield Township, grades 9-12 are girls' only)
 Ladywood High School (Livonia)
 Marian High School (Bloomfield Township)
 Mercy High School (Farmington Hills)
 Regina High School (Warren)
 St. Catherine of Siena Academy (Wixom)
 Former
 Girls Catholic Central High School
 Our Lady of Guadalupe Girls' Middle School

Minnesota
 Convent of the Visitation School (Mendota Heights)

Mississippi
 Our Lady Academy (Bay St. Louis)

Missouri
 Cor Jesu Academy (St. Louis)
 Hawthorn Leadership School for Girls (St. Louis)
 Incarnate Word Academy (Bel-Nor)
 Nerinx Hall High School (Webster Groves)
 Notre Dame de Sion School, Kansas City
 Notre Dame High School (St. Louis)
 Rosati-Kain High School (St. Louis)
 St. Joseph's Academy (St. Louis)
 St. Teresa's Academy (Kansas City)
 Ursuline Academy (Oakland)
 Villa Duchesne (Frontenac) (all-girls grades 7-12, co-ed elementary)
 Visitation Academy of St. Louis

Former girls' schools
 Became coeducational
 Laboure High School.  Became Cardinal Ritter College Prep (St. Louis)
 Closed
 Xavier High School.  Building sold to St. Louis University
 St. Alphonsus Rock High School
 St. Elizabeth Academy (Missouri) (St. Louis)

Nebraska
 Duchesne Academy of the Sacred Heart (Nebraska)
 Marian High School (Nebraska)
 Mercy High School (Omaha, Nebraska)

New Jersey
 New York City area
 Girls' Academy of Newark
 Academy of the Holy Angels 
 Academy of Saint Elizabeth 
 Benedictine Academy 
 Bruriah High School for Girls 
 Immaculate Conception High School
 Immaculate Heart Academy 
 Kenmare High School
 Kent Place School
 Lacordaire Academy (Coed PK-8+girls' high)
 Ma'ayanot Yeshiva High School 
 Mary Help of Christians Academy
 Mother Seton Regional High School 
 Mount Saint Dominic Academy 
 Oak Knoll School of the Holy Child 
 Saint Dominic Academy 
 Saint Vincent Academy
 Stuart Country Day School 
 Villa Victoria Academy 
 Villa Walsh Academy
 Philadelphia area
 Our Lady of Mercy Academy (Franklin Township)

 Closed
 Academy of the Sacred Heart (Hoboken, New Jersey)
 Academy of St. Aloysius (Jersey City)
 Caritas Academy (Jersey City)
 Holy Family Academy (Bayonne)

 Merged
 Battin High School (Elizabeth) – Merged into Elizabeth High School

New York
 Public (all in New York City)
 Young Women's Leadership School, Brooklyn
 Urban Assembly Institute of Math and Science for Young Women (New York City)
 Urban Assembly School of Business for Young Women (New York City)
 Young Women's Leadership School of East Harlem 
 Young Women's Leadership School, Astoria (New York City)
 The Young Women's Leadership School of Queens

Private:
 Manhattan
 Brearley School
 Cathedral High School
 Chapin School
 Convent of the Sacred Heart
 Dominican Academy
 Hewitt School
 Manhattan High School for Girls
 Marymount School of New York
 Nightingale-Bamford School
 Notre Dame School
 Spence School
 St. Jean Baptiste High School
 St. Vincent Ferrer High School
 Brooklyn
 Beth Jacob High School
 Beth Rivkah
 Bishop Kearney High School
 B’nos Leah Prospect Park Yeshiva School
 B’nos Yisroel High School for Girls
 Fontbonne Hall Academy
 Merkaz Bnos High School
 Shulamith School for Girls of Brooklyn
 Soille Bais Yaakov High School
 St. Joseph High School
 Saint Saviour High School of Brooklyn
 Tomer Devora High School for Girls
 Yeshivat Shaare Torah Girls High School
 Queens
 The Mary Louis Academy
 Shevach High School
 St. Agnes Academic High School
 Torah Academy High School for Girls
 Yeshiva University High School for Girls
 Bronx
 Academy of Mount St. Ursula
 Aquinas High School
 Preston High School
 St. Barnabas High School
 St. Catharine Academy
 St. Raymond Academy
 Staten Island
 Notre Dame Academy
 St. John Villa Academy
 St. Joseph Hill Academy
 Hudson Valley
 Academy of Our Lady of Good Counsel
 Avir Yaakov Girls School
 Maria Regina High School
 School of the Holy Child
 The Ursuline School
 Long Island
 Stella K. Abraham High School for Girls
 Our Lady of Mercy Academy
 Sacred Heart Academy
 Shulamith School for Girls in Long Island
 Capital District
 Albany Academy for Girls
 Western New York
 Buffalo Seminary (SEM)
 Mount Mercy Academy

 Became coeducational
 Moore Catholic High School (Staten Island)
 St. Joseph by the Sea High School (Staten Island)

Closed
 Bais Yaakov Machon Academy (Queens)
 Catherine McAuley High School (Brooklyn)
 Mother Cabrini High School (Manhattan)
 The Girls' Commercial High School (became coeducational as Prospect_Heights_High_School and then closed)
 St. Michael Academy (Manhattan)
 Stella Maris High School (Queens)
 St. Peter's High School for Girls (Staten Island)
 Academy of Saint Joseph (Long Island; Coed K-8, Girls' 9-12)

North Carolina
 Saint Mary's School (Raleigh, North Carolina)
 Salem Academy

Ohio
 Columbus
 Columbus School for Girls
 Cincinnati area
 Mercy McAuley High School
 Mother of Mercy High School (Cincinnati, Ohio) merged into McAuley High
 Mount Notre Dame High School
 Seton High School (Cincinnati, Ohio)
 St. Ursula Academy (Cincinnati, Ohio)
 Ursuline Academy
 Cleveland area
 Beaumont School
 Hathaway Brown School
 Laurel School
 Magnificat High School
 Our Lady of the Elms High School
 Saint Joseph Academy
 Toledo area
 Notre Dame Academy
 St. Ursula Academy

 Former girls' schools
 Hoban Dominican High School (Cleveland area) (closed)
 McAuley High School (Toledo area (closed)
 Regina High School (Cleveland area) (closed)
 St. Augustine Academy (Cleveland area) (closed) 
 Sacred Heart Academy (Cincinnati, Ohio)
 St. Joseph Academy - became coed, renamed to Archbishop McNicholas High School
 Ursuline Academy of the Holy Name of Jesus (Youngstown) (became coeducational)
 Notre Dame Academy (Cleveland Area) (merged into coed school)
 Villa Angela Academy (Cleveland area) (merged into coed school)

Oregon
 St. Mary's Academy (Portland, Oregon)

Pennsylvania
 Philadelphia area
 Philadelphia High School for Girls
 Al-Aqsa Islamic Academy (girls' high school)
 Saint Basil Academy
 Country Day School of the Sacred Heart
 J. W. Hallahan Catholic Girls High School
 Agnes Irwin School
 The Baldwin School
 Gwynedd Mercy Academy High School
 Little Flower Catholic High School for Girls
 Merion Mercy Academy
 Mount Saint Joseph Academy
 Moore College of Art and Design
 Nazareth Academy High School
 Academy of Notre Dame de Namur
 Archbishop Prendergast High School
 St. Hubert Catholic High School for Girls
 Villa Joseph Marie High School
 Villa Maria Academy
 Pittsburgh area
 Oakland Catholic High School

Closed:
 The Young Women's Leadership School at Rhodes High School (Philadelphia)
 Notre Dame Catholic Girls High School  (Philadelphia)

Merged:
 Archbishop Prendergast High School - Merged into Bonner & Prendergast High School, which initially had separate campuses by gender
 Saint Maria Goretti High School (Philadelphia) – Merged into Saints John Neumann and Maria Goretti Catholic High School
 West Philadelphia Catholic High School for Girls – Merged into West Philadelphia Catholic High School

Rhode Island
 Lincoln School (Providence, Rhode Island)
 St. Mary Academy – Bay View
 Overbrook Academy (grades 6-11)
 Former girls' schools
 Bishop Keough Regional High School (closed)

Texas
 Austin area
 Richards School for Young Women Leaders (Austin)
 Dallas-Fort Worth
 Rangel Young Women's Leadership School (Dallas)
 Hockaday School (Dallas)
 Mesorah High School for Girls (Dallas)
 Ursuline Academy (Dallas)
 Young Women's Leadership Academy (Fort Worth)
 Young Women's Leadership Academy at Arnold (Grand Prairie)
 Young Women's STEAM Academy at Balch Springs Middle School (Balch Springs) - Dallas ISD
 Solar Preparatory School for Girls at James B. Bonham - Dallas ISD.
 El Paso
 Loretto Academy (PK-5 coed, 6-12 girls' only)
 Houston
 Young Women's College Preparatory Academy
 Duchesne Academy
 Incarnate Word Academy
 Saint Agnes Academy
 The Lawson Academy (formerly William A. Lawson Institute for Peace and Prosperity (WALIPP) - Texas Southern University (TSU) Preparatory Academy) - girls' program
 KIPP Voyage Academy for Girls
 Lubbock area
 Talkington School for Young Women Leaders (Lubbock)
 San Antonio 
 Incarnate Word High School 
 Providence High School
 Young Women's Leadership Academy

 Closed
 St. Francis Academy (San Antonio)

 Merged
 Dominican High School into O'Connell College Preparatory School

 Became coeducational
 Father Yermo (El Paso)

Virginia
 Madeira School
 Foxcroft School
 Oakcrest School
 St. Catherine's School (Richmond)
 Saint Gertrude High School

In addition King Abdullah Academy, while coeducational, has separate girls' secondary classes.

Washington (state)
 Forest Ridge School of the Sacred Heart
 Holy Names Academy
 Seattle Girls' School
 Annie Wright Schools has a separate girls' high school

Wisconsin
 Divine Savior Holy Angels High School (Milwaukee)
 St. Joan Antida High School (Milwaukee)

Guam
 Academy of Our Lady of Guam

 Former girls' schools
 Notre Dame High School (Guam) (became coeducational in 1995)

See also
 Online School for Girls
 Women's education in the United States
 Women's colleges in the United States
 Timeline of women's colleges in the United States
 List of boys' schools in the United States

References

Girls
Girls' schools in the United States
United States